Paul (died after 1113) was a Hungarian prelate in the twelfth century, who served as Archbishop of Kalocsa between around 1111 and 1113.

Archbishop
Paul was styled as "Bishop of Kalocsa" ( [...] Colocensis) by two royal charters of Coloman, King of Hungary issued regarding the Zobor Abbey in 1111 and 1113. His title reflects the claim of Archdiocese of Esztergom for exclusive supremacy within the Hungarian ecclesiastical hierarchy, which emerged during the governance of Lawrence of Esztergom, who refused to recognize the Archdiocese of Kalocsa as an equal see with Esztergom. A non-authentic charter, allegedly issued in 1111, also claims that the see of Kalocsa was one of the suffragan bishoprics of the Archdiocese of Esztergom.

Paul attended the Second Synod of Esztergom, which most probably took place in March 1112. Paul was succeeded by Fulbert, who first appeared in this capacity in 1118.

Notes

Sources

 
 
 

|-

Archbishops of Kalocsa
12th-century Roman Catholic archbishops in Hungary
11th-century Hungarian people
12th-century Hungarian people